The 1997–98 Boston Bruins season was the team's 74th season. The season involved drafting Joe Thornton first overall.

Off-season

Regular season

The Bruins allowed the fewest shorthanded goals (3) and were the most disciplined team during the regular season, being short-handed only 285 times.

Final standings

Schedule and results

Playoffs

Eastern Conference Quarterfinals

Washington Capitals 4, Boston Bruins 2

Player statistics

Regular season
Scoring

Goaltending

Playoffs
Scoring

Goaltending

Awards and honors

Draft picks
Boston's picks at the 1997 NHL Entry Draft in Pittsburgh, Pennsylvania.

References
 Bruins on Hockey Database

Boston Bruins seasons
Boston Bruins
Boston Bruins
Boston Bruins
Boston Bruins
Bruins
Bruins